Maesiella is a genus of sea snails, marine gastropod mollusks in the family Pseudomelatomidae.

The generic name Maesiella is named in honor of American malacologist Virginia Orr Maes.

Species
Species within the genus Maesiella include:
 Maesiella dominguezi (J. & W. Gibson-Smith, 1983)
 Maesiella hermanita (Pilsbry & Lowe, 1932)
 Maesiella maesae McLean & Poorman, 1971
 Maesiella punctatostriata (Carpenter, 1856)
Species brought into synonymy
 Maesiella solitaria Pilsbry & Lowe, 1932: synonym of Maesiella punctatostriata (Carpenter, 1856)

References

External links
 McLean, J.H. (1971) A revised classification of the family Turridae, with the proposal of new subfamilies, genera, and subgenera from the Eastern Pacific. The Veliger, 14, 114–130
 
 Bouchet, P.; Kantor, Y. I.; Sysoev, A.; Puillandre, N. (2011). A new operational classification of the Conoidea (Gastropoda). Journal of Molluscan Studies. 77(3): 273-308
 Worldwide Mollusc Species Data Base: Pseudomelatomidae

 
Pseudomelatomidae
Gastropod genera